Major League Soccer has been broadcast live in the United States nationally since the league's inception in 1996 and in Canada since 2007. As of the 2023 season, Apple Inc. is the primary global rights holder and will stream every regular season and playoff match on MLS Season Pass – a new service on the Apple TV app. Some matches will also be broadcast on television via Fox Sports in the United States, and Bell Media (via TSN and RDS) in Canada.

United States television

1990s–2006 
Major League Soccer with ESPN and ABC Sports announced the league's first television rights deal on March 15, 1994, without any players, coaches, or teams in place. The three-year agreement covered English-language broadcasting for the 1996–1998 seasons, and committed 10 matches on ESPN, 25 on ESPN2, and the MLS Cup on ABC. The deal gave MLS no rights fees, but the advertising revenue was divided between the league and networks.

During the 1990s, Univision and Galavisión broadcast matches in Spanish. The original Univision deal ended in 1999. Telemundo picked up MLS in 2000, but disputes over time slots led to the network dropping MLS after the 2001 season. ABC and ESPN were left as the only MLS broadcasters in 2002.

In 2003, Fox Sports World (later Fox Soccer Channel) also became an English-language TV partner to MLS, while Fox Sports en Español became the Spanish-language partner in the same year.

2007–2014 
In August 2006, MLS and ESPN announced an eight-year contract spanning 2007–2014 giving the league its first rights-fee agreement worth US$8 million annually. The deal gave the MLS a regular primetime slot on Thursdays, televised coverage of the first round of the MLS SuperDraft and an expanded presence on other ESPN properties, such as ESPN360 (now ESPN3) and Mobile ESPN. The agreement also placed each season's opening match, the MLS All-Star Game and the MLS Cup on ABC.

In September 2006, the media announced a deal between the Univision network and Soccer United Marketing (SUM) worth US$80 million. The network agreed to broadcast 25 MLS matches per season, ten U.S. men's national team matches and five international matches operated by SUM; although, ratings were volatile.

Disappointing ratings led to a 2008 push by ESPN to bolster its popularity through measures such as using JP Dellacamera, a veteran play-by-play soccer commentator, instead of baseball announcer Dave O'Brien, as well as an arrangement to simulcast MLS matches in Spanish on ESPN Deportes, with the intention of gaining additional Hispanic viewers with a Spanish style. ESPN programming executive Scott Guglielmino explained: "From my perspective, the only question in my mind when it comes to growth is how quickly over time MLS and its management group want to spend on players ... You’re in a worldwide market. The question is how quickly the ownership group wants to push that envelope."

After two years of low ratings, network executives decided to transfer all ABC matches to ESPN. The MLS Cup had been broadcast on ABC each year from 1996 to 2008, but with ratings declining from 1.4, in 1996 and 1997, to 0.6 in 2008, the MLS Cup was moved to ESPN at the start of 2009. The network also replaced the regular Thursday night telecast with a "game of the week" on either Wednesday, Thursday, Friday, or Saturday nights, to give MLS matches better lead-in programming and more flexibility to air better matchups.

In 2011, Fox Soccer Channel and MLS agreed to a one-year extension to televise up to 31 regular-season matches and three playoff game, in a deal worth around US$7 million. MLS Wrap was a MLS highlight show that aired on Fox Soccer Channel that was often hosted by Sean Wheelock, with analyst John Harkes.

In 2012, NBC Sports Group replaced Fox Sports as the league's second English-language broadcaster, with matches airing on NBCSN (which was available in approximately twice as many homes as Fox Soccer), and selected matches on the NBC broadcast network. NBCSN broadcast 44 matches and NBC broadcast 5 matches—the average combined audience for NBC and NBCSN's matches in 2012 was 122 percent higher than the average audience for Fox Soccer's matches in 2011. ESPN ratings also increased in 2012 from the prior year, as a number of MLS matches were shown on ESPN in 2012, instead of a primary focus on ESPN2, as had been the case previously.

2015–2022 
On May 12, 2014, MLS announced an eight-year broadcasting deal between ESPN and Fox Sports in English, and Univision in Spanish, covering television, digital, and the possibility of radio rights. The biggest change under the new deal was the establishment of a consistent national window for each broadcaster; UniMas airs matches on Friday nights, while ESPN2 and Fox Sports 1 air matches on Sunday evenings and nights respectively (jointly promoted as Soccer Sunday). All three broadcasters will air at least 34 regular-season matches per-season during these windows. ESPN and Fox Sports will also share in English-language coverage of the playoffs, and alternate airing the All-Star Game and MLS Cup yearly. Univision will air Spanish-language coverage of the MLS Cup and All-Star Game, and exclusively air two playoff knockout-round matches per season. Matches exclusively televised by Univision include English-language commentary via second audio program. The deal also includes options for national radio rights for ESPN Radio and Fox Sports Radio, rights to United States men's national team matches for all three broadcasters, rights for ESPN International, and an option for ESPN to take over the distribution of the league's out-of-market package.

ESPN and Fox Sports pay a combined $75 million per season, and Univision pays $15 million per-season. In Canada TSN and TVA pay a combined $15m per season. Totaling at around $105 million per-season, nearly five times the value of the league's previous deal, it is the highest-valued television rights deal in MLS history. Commissioner Garber stated at the announcement that the new contracts were "another strong indicator of the League's continued growth and the overall fan interest in our sport".

In March 2017, it was announced that Facebook had reached a deal to stream English-language coverage of the nationally televised matches allotted to Univision. The streams would include interactive features, while MLS also announced that it would stream a news program known as Matchday Live on its Facebook page to complement the new deal.

Prior to the 2018 season, ESPN invoked its option to take over the out-of-market streaming rights to Major League Soccer. The MLS Live service was discontinued, and out-of-market matches became an overall component of the new ESPN+ subscription streaming service that launched in April 2018 (with MLS Live temporarily made available for free prior to the service's official launch). Twitter replaced Facebook as the English streaming rightsholder for Univision's matches under a three-year deal.

The 2018 season also saw significant developments in regional broadcast rights, as Chicago Fire and newly established Los Angeles FC chose to sell their regional television rights exclusively to subscription streaming services (the aforementioned ESPN+, and YouTube TV, respectively), rather than a local broadcaster or regional sports network. Several teams (including Real Salt Lake and the Seattle Sounders FC) also reached in-market streaming deals alongside a flagship television broadcaster. In 2019, D.C. United similarly signed with FloSports (replacing Sinclair Broadcast Group), however the partnership was met with criticism over the more-limited availability of the broadcasts, as well as promised supplemental coverage that never materialized. The team broke away from FloSports prior to the final game of the season, and re-signed Sinclair for the 2020 season. Also in 2020, Chicago Fire FC returned to regional linear television with a multi-year deal with WGN-TV, concurrent with the final year of its agreement with ESPN+.

2023–2032 
MLS requested that its teams not negotiate regional television rights beyond the 2022 season, suggesting that the league was considering switching to a centralized model for its broadcast rights (more akin to the NFL and European club leagues). 

On June 14, 2022, MLS announced a 10-year broadcasting deal with Apple Inc. taking effect in the 2023 season, under which the company will hold the global over-the-top streaming rights to all MLS and Leagues Cup matches, and selected MLS Next and MLS Next Pro matches. They will stream on a new subscription service called MLS Season Pass which will be offered exclusively through the Apple TV app. Season Pass will be a separate offering from Apple's main streaming service Apple TV+, but a package of MLS and Leagues Cup matches will stream for Apple TV+ subscribers, and a subset of these matches (potentially over 40%) will be available for free. Season ticket holders for MLS teams will also receive free access to the service. The acquisition is Apple's second major foray into sports broadcast rights, after having acquired a package of Friday-night Major League Baseball games for Apple TV+ in 2022.

Under the deal, MLS will assume the production of all match telecasts, teams will no longer be allowed to sell regional broadcast rights, and no match will be subject to blackouts. Commentary will be available in English and Spanish, as well as French for matches involving Canadian teams. The majority of matches will be played on Wednesday and Saturday nights, with scheduled kickoffs potentially occurring at 7:30 p.m. local time. Although Apple will hold the rights to all MLS matches, the league stated that it was still exploring a linear television package. Every match will be called on-site, and it was reported that IMG will handle the production for all match telecasts.

Fox Sports and Fox Deportes will air matches in English and Spanish, respectively, on linear U.S. TV: 34 matches in the regular season, eight in the postseason, and each MLS Cup until 2026. ESPN and Univision will no longer be involved in the televising of MLS matches, with ESPN severing ties after being the primary partner for the league's entire history and Univision having done so in the 1990s and from 2007 to 2022. Univision, however, will televise select Leagues Cup matches, including exclusive linear coverage of the final. Both ESPN and Univision are believed to have left negotiations due to conflicts over the Apple contract; in addition to both companies operating streaming platforms of their own (ESPN+ and Vix respectively), Jonathan Tannenwald of The Philadelphia Inquirer reported that ESPN disagreed with Apple putting the games which would have been part of an ESPN sublicense deal outside of the MLS Season Pass paywall, while Josh Sim of SportsPro Media speculated that Univision disapproved of Apple presenting Spanish-language coverage of MLS games.

Canadian television 

Coverage of MLS expanded into Canada in 2007 with the addition of Toronto FC. From 2007 to 2010, CBC, Sportsnet, and later GolTV Canada (owned by team parent company Maple Leaf Sports & Entertainment), broadcast Toronto FC matches nationwide, and GolTV carried broadcasts of selected regular-season matches not involving Toronto FC.

Bell Media has held national English-language rights to Major League Soccer in Canada since 2011, and reached a 5-year extension for English-language rights only beginning in the 2017 season. Matches primarily air on the TSN networks, and beginning in 2017, selected matches are simulcast on the terrestrial CTV network. As of the 2017 season, TVA Sports holds the national French-language rights to Major League Soccer in Canada.

As in the United States, the individual Canadian clubs have also negotiated separate broadcast deals for matches not aired under the Bell Media national contract (although there are no blackouts of these "regional" broadcasts outside of the team's territory). TSN and Sportsnet formerly split coverage of Toronto FC regional matches (their parent companies hold a joint majority stake in MLSE), TVA Sports airs Montreal Impact matches in a separate deal, and TSN broadcasts the Vancouver Whitecaps in a separate deal. In the 2017 season, Sportsnet discontinued its TFC coverage, and its matches moved exclusively to TSN.

In the 2018 season, DAZN took over rights to out-of-market streaming of matches as part of its overall service, with live and on-demand coverage of all-U.S., matches, and on-demand streaming of matches featuring Canadian clubs 48 hours after their original broadcast.

Canadian television rights were included in the global rights deal between MLS and Apple Inc. which will begin with the 2023 season. All games involving Canadian teams will feature French language commentary, in addition to commentary feeds in English and Spanish. The league will simulcast some games on traditional linear television networks such as TSN and RDS.

Current broadcasting contracts

Global

United States

Canada

Ratings and viewers

Regular season

Notes:

 Although the viewing numbers on ESPN2 declined by 36,000 from 2007 to 2008, ESPN began simulcasting MLS matches on ESPN Deportes in 2008, attracting an average of 40,000 viewers.
 Fox Soccer began getting ratings in October 2008.  The Fox Soccer numbers for 2008 represent only the last four matches of the season.  Viewership numbers prior to October 2008 are unavailable.
 FOX OTA- (Over-The-Air) average viewing numbers includes the FOX Deportes Spanish language Simulcast average viewing number for the 2016–2017 seasons.
In 2019 MLS averaged 277,000 viewers for the regular season across ESPN networks per ESPN Press Room Press Release.
In 2020 COVID affected season MLS averaged 257,000 viewers across ESPN networks, viewership average for Fox Sports and Univision networks were unvailable for the 2020 season.

MLS cable viewership average 

Notes:

 Cable viewership average includes MLS average Television Viewing Audience across the National Broadcast Networks in which matches air.
 Numbers do not include streaming viewership.

MLS Cup Finals

1996–2008

2009–present

 The MLS Cup Final has also been aired on Spanish-language networks TeleFutura in 2007 and 2008, Galavision from 2009 to 2011, TeleFutura / UniMás from 2012 to 2018, and Univision in 2019. The 2020 MLS Cup had 1.677 million viewers. Simulcast audiences were listed as FOX with 1.071 million viewers, UniMas with 459,000 and TUDN with 147,000

Single-game records

Previous national broadcasting networks 
 Univision, 1996–1999, 2015–2022
 Telemundo, 2000–2001
 Fox Soccer, 2003–2011
 ABC, 1996–2008, 2019–2022
 HDNet
 TeleFutura/UniMás, 2007–2022
 CBC, 2007–2009
 NBC Sports, 2012–2014
 ESPN/ESPN2, 1996–2022
 TUDN, 2015–2022
 TVA Sports, 2017–2022

Previous regional broadcasting networks

MLS broadcasts 
* MLS ExtraTime
 MLS Game of the Week
 MLS Soccer Saturday
 MLS Soccer Wednesday
 MLS Wrap
 MLS on Apple TV
 MLS Season Pass
 MLS on Fox

See also 
 
 Major League Soccer#Media coverage
 Soccer in the United States#Soccer on TV
 Major professional sports leagues in the United States and Canada#Television exposure
 List of current Major League Soccer broadcasters
 Sports broadcasting contracts in the United States
 English football on television
 World Series television ratings
 Stanley Cup Finals television ratings
 NBA Finals television ratings
 Major League Baseball television contracts
 National Basketball Association on television
 National Hockey League on television

References 

 
ESPN
ESPN2
ABC Sports
NBC Sports
NBCSN
The Sports Network
CBC Sports
Fox Soccer original programming
Fox Sports 1
Fox Sports original programming
UniMás original programming
Univision original programming
Wide World of Sports (American TV series)
History of sports broadcasting